King Diamond is a Danish heavy metal band formed in 1985 by vocalist King Diamond, guitarists Andy LaRocque and Michael Denner, bassist Timi Hansen and drummer Mikkey Dee. King, Denner and Hansen had recently departed the group Mercyful Fate, and decided to form a new band under the King Diamond moniker, as it was already known from the Mercyful Fate days. Since the band's inception, there have been over fifteen musicians in and out of King Diamond, with the only two mainstays being Diamond and LaRocque. Their current lineup consists of King, LaRocque, guitarist Mike Wead, drummer Matt Thompson, and bassist Pontus Egberg.

King Diamond has released a total of twelve studio albums (most of them are concept albums), two live albums, two extended plays, five compilations and five singles. Their first album, Fatal Portrait, was released in 1986, followed a year later by the band's first concept album Abigail (1987). Three more albums were released before the band was put on hiatus around 1992, when King Diamond reunited with his former outfit Mercyful Fate. Diamond reformed the band in 1994, and would balance recording and touring with both Mercyful Fate and his eponymous band throughout the 1990s. King Diamond has remained active since then, despite having not released a studio album since 2007's Give Me Your Soul...Please.

History

Formation to Abigail (1985–1987)

The band was formed in 1985 by vocalist King Diamond, guitarist Michael Denner, and bassist Timi Hansen. The three had recently departed from the group Mercyful Fate, which fell apart due to musical differences between King Diamond and guitarist Hank Shermann. According to Diamond, when he, Denner, and Hansen decided to form a new band, they chose the name "King Diamond" to "get better deals", and because the name was already known from Mercyful Fate. To round-out the line-up of the King Diamond band, the group chose drummer Mikkey Dee and guitarist Andy LaRocque.

In July 1985, the band began recording their debut album at Sound Track Studio in Copenhagen, Denmark. On 25 December, they released their debut single "No Presents for Christmas". Fatal Portrait, the band's first full-length studio album, was released on 17 February 1986, through Roadrunner Records. Produced by Rune Höyer and vocalist King Diamond, the album charted at number 33 on the Swedish album chart, and spawned the single "Halloween", which was released on 6 June 1986.

In December 1986, King Diamond began recording their second studio album, once again at Sound Track Studio in Copenhagen, Denmark. The band released the single "The Family Ghost" on 1 July 1987, for which they also shot their first music video. On 15 June 1987, King Diamond released the album Abigail, their first concept album based on an original story by vocalist King Diamond. The album went on to chart at number 39 in Sweden, number 68 in the Netherlands, and at number 123 on the Billboard 200. Following Abigails release, guitarist Michael Denner left the band due to touring strains. He was subsequently replaced by Mike Moon for the album's supporting tour, during which the band recorded the live album In Concert 1987: Abigail (however it wasn't released until 1991).

"Them" and Conspiracy (1988–1989)

Following the completion of the Abigail tour, guitarist Mike Moon and bassist Timi Hansen were replaced by Pete Blakk and Hal Patino respectively. On 13 September 1988, King Diamond released the album "Them", which was recorded at M.M.C. Studio in Copenhagen, Denmark. Another concept album, "Them" charted at number 38 on the Swedish album chart, number 65 on the Dutch album chart, and at number 89 on the Billboard 200, making "Them" King Diamond's highest charting album in America to date. Another music video was also shot, this time for the single "Welcome Home". On 1 November, the group released The Dark Sides EP, a collection of previously released material as well as one unreleased track.

Following the completion of the supporting tour for "Them", Mikkey Dee left King Diamond. However, he was rehired to play drums on the band's follow-up album, after which he was replaced by Snowy Shaw. On 21 August 1989, King Diamond released the album Conspiracy, which charted at number 41 on the Swedish album chart, number 64 on the Dutch album chart, and at number 111 on the Billboard 200. A continuation of the storyline from "Them", Conspiracy was the first King Diamond album recorded in the United States being recorded at Rumbo Recording Studios in Canoga Park, California. A music video was also made for the track "Sleepless Nights".

The Eye to House of God (1990–2000)

In June 1990, King Diamond began recording fifth studio album The Eye at Sweet Silence Studios in Copenhagen, Denmark. It was released on 30 October 1990. The drums on the album were performed by drummer Snowy Shaw using drum pads. It debuted at number 179 on the Billboard 200. However, the band did not tour in support of the album due to the lack of label support. Following The Eye, Hal Patino and Pete Blakk were replaced by Sharlee D'Angelo and Mike Wead respectively. However this line-up ended-up not recording any material, as vocalist King Diamond reunited with Mercyful Fate in 1992 (King Diamond would balance recording and touring with both Mercyful Fate and his eponymous band throughout the 1990s).

After recording and touring with Mercyful Fate, King Diamond reformed his eponymous band in 1994. With the line-up of King Diamond, Andy La Rocque, as well as guitarist Herb Simonsen, bassist Chris Estes and drummer Darrin Anthony from the Texas band Mindstorm, the band spent September through October 1994, recording their next album. Released on 6 June 1995, The Spider's Lullabye was the band's first album on Metal Blade Records, as well as their first studio release since Fatal Portrait to not be a concept album. The album went on to peak at number 31 on the Finnish album charts. In March 1996, King Diamond began recording their seventh studio album at the Dallas Sound Lab. Released on 1 October 1996, The Graveyard saw King Diamond returning to writing concept albums. The album also charted at number 23 in Finland. After the album's release, drummer Darrin Anthony was forced to leave the band due to a car accident and was subsequently replaced by Chastain drummer John Luke Hebert.

On 24 February 1998, King Diamond released the album Voodoo, which charted at number 27 on the Finnish album chart and at number 55 on the Swedish album chart. After the album's release, guitarist Herb Simonsen was replaced by Glen Drover. When Mercyful Fate was put on hold in 1999, King Diamond began recording the album House of God at the Nomad Recording Studio in Carrollton, Texas, with their new bassist Paul David Harbour, who had replaced Chris Estes. Released on 20 June 2000, the album peaked at number 60 in Sweden. After the album's release, guitarist Glen Drover, drummer John Luke Hebert and bassist Paul David Harbour were replaced by Mike Wead, Matt Thompson and Hal Patino respectively.

Later years (2001–2017)

In May 2001, King Diamond began recording their tenth studio album once again at the Nomad Recording Studio. Released on 29 January 2002, Abigail II: The Revenge was a sequel to 1987's Abigail album. It was also the first King Diamond album since 1990's The Eye to feature bassist Hal Patino who rejoined the band during the recording process. King Diamond did not tour in support of Abigail II, as Metal Blade could not provide tour support, due to illegal downloading. Despite this, the album went on to peak at number 24 in Finland and at number 42 in Sweden.

On 21 October 2003, King Diamond released the album The Puppet Master, which charted at number 36 in Sweden. Besides featuring the band, the album also featured additional vocals from Livia Zita, who is also King Diamond's wife. During the supporting tour for The Puppet Master, the band recorded the live album Deadly Lullabyes, which was released 21 September 2004. In April 2006, former bandmate Mikkey Dee (currently with Scorpions, formerly with Motörhead) made a guest appearance at King Diamond's sold-out gig in Gothenburg, Sweden. On 26 June 2007, King Diamond released the album Give Me Your Soul...Please. The album went on to peak at number 25 on the Finnish chart, number 28 on the Swedish chart, and at number 174 on the Billboard 200. The track "Never Ending Hill" also garnered a Grammy nomination for "Best Metal Performance" (the group's first). A music video was also made for the album's title track.

In late November 2010, King Diamond was rushed to the hospital after having several heart attacks. There it was discovered that three of his arteries had been blocked, which meant he had to undergo triple bypass surgery. Following a successful operation, he returned home to rest. Diamond also stopped smoking entirely, changed his diet and began getting regular exercise, according to his wife. On 27 January 2012, Diamond made a special appearance at the "5th Annual Nomad Recording Studio Throwdown", performing three songs: "The Family Ghost", "Evil" and "Burn". On 9 June 2012, the entire King Diamond band played at the Sweden Rock Festival. They were also joined on stage by Michael Denner, Hank Shermann, Mickey Dee and Volbeat's Michael Poulsen. Vocalist King Diamond stated that the band was expected to begin writing new material for their thirteenth studio album in the fall of 2012.

On 19 July 2014, the band announced that Hal Patino has been relieved of his duties, for reasons very similar to why he was fired from the band in 1990. He was replaced by Pontus Egberg, formerly of the bands Lion's Share and the Poodles. In October, King Diamond announced a new compilation titled Dreams of Horror which was released in November through Metal Blade Records, covering the band's entire career. In December, Egberg became an official member of the band.

King Diamond took part in the 2015 Rockstar Energy Mayhem Festival along with bands such as Slayer (who was chosen as the headliner), Hellyeah, The Devil Wears Prada, Thy Art Is Murder, Jungle Rot, Sister Sin, Sworn In, Shattered Sun, Feed Her to the Sharks, Code Orange and Kissing Candice. The tour ran from 26 June through 2 August. At the 8 July 2015 show in Milwaukee, Wisconsin, King Diamond was forced to perform without his signature face paint due to a severe eye infection, in which doctors advised against the use of any makeup. He said that there was no negative feedback from the fans. The band then embarked on a special tour from October to December 2015 with thrash metal band Exodus, where the 1987 album Abigail was performed in its entirety.

The Institute (2018–present)
In 2018, King Diamond started work on its thirteenth studio album, which would be divided into two parts to connect with its theme. The first part of the series was later revealed to be titled The Institute. It was planned to be released in 2020 with a North American tour taking place in the fall of 2019; its release date was later pushed back to 2022 and then to 2023. The first single from the album, "Masquerade of Madness", was made available for streaming on 8 November 2019. On 25 January 2019, the first ever live video Songs for the Dead Live was released.

MembersCurrent members'''
King Diamond – vocals, keyboards (1985–present)
Andy LaRocque – guitars, keyboards (1985–present)
Mike Wead – guitars (1991–1993, 2000–present)
Matt Thompson – drums (2000–present)
Pontus Egberg – bass (2014–present)

Discography

Studio albumsFatal Portrait (1986)Abigail (1987)"Them" (1988)Conspiracy (1989)The Eye (1990)The Spider's Lullabye (1995)The Graveyard (1996)Voodoo (1998)House of God (2000)Abigail II: The Revenge (2002)The Puppet Master (2003)Give Me Your Soul...Please (2007)The Institute'' (TBA)

References

External links 
 

1985 establishments in Denmark
Danish heavy metal musical groups
Metal Blade Records artists
Musical quintets
Musical groups established in 1985
Roadrunner Records artists